Nobin Chandra Das (1845–1925) was a Bengali confectioner, entrepreneur, businessman and Bengali cultural icon in the second half of 19th and early 20th century. Widely known as the creator of the iconic Bengali sweetmeat "Rosogolla", a popular limerick of 19th-century Bengal labeled him as the "Columbus of Rossogolla" or simply the "Father of Rosogolla".

Born and raised in Kolkata at the time of its rise to prominence as the capital of East India Company's Indian possessions, Nobin Chandra Das's major contribution to Bengali culture and society was his innovative confectionery which created completely new sweetmeats for the Bengali palate. His creations constitute an important and lasting component of Bengali cuisine today. His other creations include "Abaar Khaabo", "Dedo Sondesh" and "Baikuntha Bhog"(both of which use "Kacha Pak" as the base ingredient), the well-known "Kastura Pak" which serves as the refined base ingredient for Sandeshes like "Aato (custard apple) Sondesh" and "Kathaal (jackfruit) Sondesh".

History
The Bengali Renaissance started in the second half of the 19th century. This era also had its impact on the world of confectionery with fresh inspiration from Bengali confectioners of the time. In the 1860s, the man who contributed most to this evolution of Bengali confectionery was Nobin Chandra Das of Bagbazar in north Kolkata (then known as Sutanotty), India. Also known as 'Nobin Moira' of Bagbazar, he set up his sweet shop in 1866; currently located on Rabindra Sarani (then known as Chitpur Road in Sutanuti), Bagbazar. Nobin Chandra's ambition was not to run just a confectionery but to create completely original sweets.

It was sometime in the year 1868 when he could create a perfectly formed sweetmeat out of fragmented clumps of casein known specifically as "Chhana" (a variant of cottage cheese), from the old Sanskrit word "Chinna" due to its crumpled texture and sparse binding capacity. It was Nobin Chandra's accomplishment that he was able to create a perfectly homogeneous spherical sweet that was both spongy and succulent with a unique and distinctive taste through a novel method of processing the "chhana" in boiling sugar syrup. Nobin Chandra christened this creation the "Rossogolla".

Birth and beginnings

Nobin Chandra was born in 1845. In 1864, driven by poverty and with little provision to complete his education, he initially started working for the Indra family, confectioners from Shantipur in the Nadia district of Bengal. They were distant relatives of Nobin Chandra's mother, and their shop was located on Chitpur road in Bagbazar, Kolkata.  However, it turned out to be a futile engagement as Nobin Chandra was reportedly humiliated by the Indras. Hence he left the job and, aged 18, started his sweet-shop at Jorasanko along with a close friend. Being respectable and prosperous sugar merchants, Nobin's family did not take kindly to his decision to become a sweetmeat seller due to the social constraints of the times. They disparagingly referred to him as the "moira" (a profession not held in high esteem in the 19th century Bengal). Ironically, no one could have foreseen at that time that history would transform their title of contempt into one of lasting adulation.

Nobin Chandra's Jorasanko business failed as he fell out with his friend. Moreover, In those days, sweetmeat shops depended largely on credit sales, and Nobin Chandra had no resources to offer credit to his customers. Not a man to give up easily, in 1866, Nobin Chandra started a new venture with another shop on Chitpur Road situated just opposite Indra's "mithai" shop in Bagbazar, where his confectioner's career had started. Most sweetmeats made at the time were either "Sondesh/Sandesh" (a sweet exclusively for the affluent, which was remolded and popularized by Bhim Chandra Nag) or sweets made of "dal" (lentils) or flour from various grains. Choices were limited, and novelty in confectionery was rare.

Birth of Rosogolla
In 1868, Nobin Chandra created "Rossogolla" – which was to be his arguably most significant creation. It was a popular sweet of his time which was affordable across all economic segments of society. It took some time for Rossogolla to become popular in the absence of advertising and media as we know it today.

While there are multiple claims based on oral tradition about "Chhana" based sweets across other parts of eastern India, documented facts indicate that the process of "Chhana" making was introduced first into Bengal by the Dutch colonists of Bandel in the late 18th century. While a form of cottage cheese may have been extant in Indian culture for millennia, the "chhena" manufactured in those days was made by using citric acid derived from natural fruit extracts. This was a coarse and granular variety with no binding capacity and could not be made to shape into a firm and defined form.  Dutch and Portuguese colonists introduced into India lactic acid (extracted from whey) to curdle milk, in the late 18th century, along with acetic acid. Nobin Chandra benefited from this knowledge that created the fine, smooth modern "chhena" with high binding capacity, which was the basic raw material on which he experimented.

However, despite synthesizing the superior variety of "Chhana" using Dutch and Portuguese technology, confectioners all across Bengal were unable to bind it into a firm form because lumps of "Chhana" in boiling sugar syrup would either form burnt clumps or crumble. Nobin Chandra's experimentation using the technology of reverse osmosis (which was commercialised in Bengal in the early 1820s) finally helped him arrive at the appropriate variety of "Chhana" with the right binding capacity to form the basis of the Rossogolla.

One particular incident may have started rossogolla's popularity in the market. One morning a landau came to a halt at Nobin's shop. A wealthy businessman of 19th century Kolkata, Raibahadur Bhagwandas Bagla, was in the carriage with his family. One of Bhagwandas’ children was thirsty, and their carriage had stopped searching for a sip of water. Nobin Chandra offered his usual hospitality but with a novelty.The little boy was given water to drink along with Rossogollas. The child was so delighted with the unique taste that he offered some to his father. The father was equally ecstatic and immediately bought a considerable quantity of Rossogollas for his family and friends. This unorthodox ‘word of mouth’ proved a very useful tool of publicity, and "Nobin Moira's" Rossogolla became famous in no time across Kolkata.

GI Status of 'Banglar Rasogolla'
In 2017, the GI Registry granted Geographical indication status to Banglar Rasogolla. In the entire proceedings before the Intellectual Property India there is not a single mentioning of Rasgulla but Rosogolla and Rossogolla, legally establishing Banglar Rasogolla. Besides that, the names Banglar Rasogolla, Rosogolla, Rossogolla or Roshogolla are from Bengali origin, while Rasgulla is from Hindi origin, as such intellectual property right awarded to Banglar Rasogolla differentiates it from Pahala rasgulla, Khiramohana and other desserts under the name Rasgulla.

Death and legacy
Nobin Chandra left his legacy to his son Krishna Chandra Das (1869–1934). Krishna Chandra enlarged the inheritance of his father's genius in the art of Bengali sweetmeats. Reinforcing the family spirit of exploration and experimentation, he created new sweets such as the "Rossomalai". another perennial favourite. To popularize the Rossomalai, Krishna Chandra opened a new sweet shop at Jorasanko in 1930 but died within four years of the opening of his new shop and left the reins of the family business in the hands of his son and successor, Sarada Charan Das.

In popular culture
In 2018, director Pavel made a film Rosogolla on the life of Nobin Chandra Das. Actor Ujaan Ganguly portrayed Nobin in the film.

See also
Bikalananda Kar
 K.C. Das
Rasgulla
 Sarada Charan Das
 K.C. Das Grandsons
 Bengali cuisine

References

1845 births
1925 deaths
Bengali culture
Businesspeople from Kolkata
Indian confectionery
Bengali Hindus